Inglisella etheridgei is a species of sea snail, a marine gastropod mollusk in the family Cancellariidae, the nutmeg snails.

Description
The shell grows to a length of 7 mm.

Distribution
This marine species is found along Victoria (Australia)

References

 Hemmen J. (2007). Recent Cancellariidae. Wiesbaden, 428pp.

Cancellariidae
Gastropods described in 1880